Kan Maax (fl. 800CE), alternatively transliterated as K'an Maax, has been identified as the last known ruler of Cancuén, a pre-Columbian Maya polity located at the headwaters of the Pasion River in modern-day Guatemala.

In 2005 an archaeological project working at the site reported that a burial with high-status characteristics had been found. The male individual interred within was reportedly identified as Kan Maax from a necklace bearing his name and title in Maya glyphs.

His body was found with the remains of his queen.

Notes

References

 
 
 
 

800 deaths
Kings of Cancuén
Year of birth unknown